List of authors of 19th-century British children's literature, arranged by year of birth:

References

Notes
† These authors' children's books are part of a larger, more diverse, literary corpus.

 Authors
Lists of 19th-century people
Lists of British writers